The Swan Lake Nature Study Area (formerly called Lemmon Valley Marsh) is a small conservation area in Lemmon Valley, Nevada.  It contains marsh, alkali mud flats, and high desert.  The Lahontan Audubon Society describes it as "a nearly unspoiled wetland in the midst of suburban housing and warehouses" and designates it a Nevada Important Bird Area.  It is a notable location for birding; over 150 species have been observed there.

It was formally dedicated as a nature study area in 1999, following several years of planning by Reno-area environmentalist/writer/photographer Bob Goodman. Other sponsoring organizations include: the Bureau of Land Management; the City of Reno; the Lahontan Audubon Society; Nevada Division of Wildlife; the Nevada Land Conservancy; Washoe County Parks and Recreation Department; and Washoe County School District. Features include an observational boardwalk into the marsh and educational signs about the local ecology.

Swan Lake is located in the midst of the rapidly developing suburbs of Stead and Lemmon Valley, near Peavine Peak north of Reno.  According to a 1995 study, humans have lived in the area since as early as 400 AD;  Native American artifacts attributed to the Washoe people have been found in the area, indicating it to have been a wintering site.

References

External links

Steady Hand Creates Reno's Swan Lake Nature Study Area - June 2004 article on the conservation area's development 
Swan Lake- Lahontan Audubon Society guide 
Press Release on recent Swan Lake grants 

Wetlands of Nevada
Protected areas of Nevada
Landforms of Washoe County, Nevada
Protected areas established in 1999
1999 establishments in Nevada